The Japanese school uniform is modeled in appearance similar to that of the European-style naval uniforms. It was first used in Japan in the late 19th century, replacing the traditional kimono. Today, school uniforms are common in many of the Japanese public and private school systems.

History

The majority of Japan's junior high and high schools require students to wear uniforms. The Japanese school uniform is not only a symbol of youth but also plays an important role in the country's culture, as they are felt to help instill a sense of discipline and community among youth. There are many types of uniforms that range from standard to unique ones varying in the ensembles used.

Japanese school uniforms have been around for 150 years.

During the Meiji period, students began to wear uniforms modelled after Western dress.

Initially, in the 1880s, female students wore Western dress, but this was rather impractical. Utako Shimoda (1854-1936), a women's activist, educator and dress reformer, found traditional kimono to be too restrictive, preventing women and girls from moving and taking part in physical activities, harming their health. While western dress was being adopted at the time, she also believed corsets to be restrictive and harmful to women's health. Utako Shimoda had worked as lady-in-waiting to Empress Shōken from 1871 to 1879. She adapted the clothing worn by ladies-in-waiting at the Japanese imperial court, which included , to make a uniform for her Jissen Women's School. It became standard wear for high schools in Japan, and is still worn to graduations.

During the Taishō period, male students began to wear  (matching black trousers and a tunic with a standing collar and five gold buttons, and geta). These are still worn today.

There was then a fashion for European-style naval uniforms, called  in Japanese, and first used in the 19th century. The idea was taken from scaled-down sailor suits worn by children coming from royal European families. It was relatively easy to sew and thus was easily adopted in the country. Talking about junior and senior high school uniforms, the traditional attire was taken from the Meiji period consisting of military-style uniform for boys and sailor outfit for girls. After which, many schools adopted a more Western-pattern Catholic uniform style. Girls started wearing white blouses with ties, blazers with their school crests, and skirts. Boys also wore white shirts with ties, blazers, and tailored trousers. Schools in Japan do not have gender-exclusive locker rooms; thus, it is quite difficult to change from classroom uniforms into sports uniforms. As a result, most students wear their sports uniforms under their classroom uniforms. Some schools are very particular with the hairstyles as well as the footwear, too. Traditionally, school uniforms were worn outside of school.

The  and sailor-style dress have always been a part of Japan's "growing modern" culture due to its formal appearance and its existence as a concept. Old-fashioned textbooks state that the uniforms were based on the Imperial Japanese Army uniform rather than the European uniforms. The sides of the uniform are similar to existing styles of Japanese dressmaking and the collar had straight lines. Many home economics classes in Japan up until the 1950s gave sewing sailor outfits as assignments. Girls sewed sailor outfits for younger children in their communities. In the 1980s,  gangs began modifying uniforms by making skirts longer and shortening the tops, and so schools began switching to blazer or sweater vest style uniforms to try to combat the effect. , 50% of Japanese junior high schools and 20% of senior high schools use sailor suit uniforms. The  stated in 2012 that, "The sailor suit is changing from adorable and cute, a look that 'appeals to the boys,' to a uniform that 'girls like to wear for themselves.'" As of that year, contemporary sailor suits have front closures with zippers or snaps and more constructed bodices. The  stated that "the form is snug to enhance the figure—the small collar helps the head look smaller, for better balance."

Usage

The Japanese junior and senior-high-school uniform traditionally consists of a military-styled uniform for boys and a sailor outfit for girls. These uniforms are based on Meiji-period formal military dress, themselves modeled on European-style naval uniforms. The sailor outfits replace the undivided  (known as ) designed by Utako Shimoda between 1920 and 1930. While this style of uniform is still in use, many schools have moved to more Western-pattern Catholic school uniform styles. These uniforms consist of a white shirt, tie, blazer with school crest, and tailored trousers (often not of the same color as the blazer) for boys and a white blouse, tie, blazer with school crest, and tartan culottes or skirt for girls.

Regardless of what type of uniform any particular school assigns its students, all schools have a summer version of the uniform (usually consisting of just a white dress shirt and the uniform slacks for boys and a reduced-weight traditional uniform or blouse and tartan skirt with tie for girls) and a sports-activity uniform (a polyester track suit for year-round use and a T-shirt and short pants for summer activities). Depending on the discipline level of any particular school, students may often wear different seasonal and activity uniforms within the same classroom during the day. Individual students may attempt to subvert the system of uniforms by wearing their uniforms incorrectly or by adding prohibited elements such as large loose socks or badges. Girls may shorten their skirts, permanently or by wrapping up the top to decrease length; boys may wear trousers about the hips, omit ties, or keep their shirts unbuttoned.

Since some schools do not have sex-segregated changing- or locker-rooms, students may change for sporting activities in their classrooms. As a result, such students may wear their sports uniforms under their classroom uniforms. Certain schools also regulate student hairstyles, footwear, and book bags; but these particular rules are usually adhered to only on special occasions, such as trimester opening and closing ceremonies and school photo days.

It is normal for uniforms to be worn outside of school areas, but this is going out of fashion and many students wear casual dress outside of school. While not many public elementary schools in Japan require uniforms, many private schools and public schools run by the central government still do so.

The color is normally black, but some schools use navy blue.

The top has a standing collar buttoning down from top-to-bottom. Buttons are usually decorated with the school emblem to show respect to the school. Pants are straight leg and a black or dark-colored belt is worn with them. Boys usually wear penny loafers or sneakers with this uniform. Some schools may require the students to wear collar-pins representing the school and/or class rank.

The  is derived from the Prussian Waffenrock or the Christian clergy cassock. The term is a combination of  meaning "study" or "student", and  meaning the Netherlands or, historically in Japan, the West in general; thus,  translates as "Western style clothes for student (uniform)".

The original model of the present day  was first established in 1886 for the students of Tokyo University. During the Japanese occupation, such clothing was also brought to school in South Korea and pre-1949 China.

Sailor 

The  is a common style of uniform worn by female middle school students, traditionally by high school students, and occasionally, elementary school students. It was modeled after the uniform used by the British Royal Navy at the time, which Lee had experienced as an exchange student in the United Kingdom.

The uniform generally consists of a blouse attached with a sailor-style collar and a pleated skirt. There are seasonal variations for summer and winter; sleeve length and fabric are adjusted accordingly. A ribbon is tied in the front and laced through a loop attached to the blouse. Several variations on the ribbon include neckties, bolo ties, neckerchiefs, and bows. Common colors include navy blue, white, gray, light green, and black.

Shoes, socks, and other accessories are sometimes included as part of the uniform. These socks are typically navy or white. The shoes are typically brown or black penny loafers. Although not part of the prescribed uniform, alternate forms of legwear (such as loose socks, knee-length stockings, or similar) are also commonly matched by more fashionable girls with their sailor outfits.

The sailor uniform today is generally associated solely with junior high schools, since a majority of high schools have changed to more Western-style plaid skirts or blazers.

Genderless uniforms 
Historically, school uniforms in Japan are decided on the basis of sex, with trousers for male students and skirts for female students. However, in April 2019, public junior high schools in Tokyo's Nakano Ward began allowing students to choose their uniform regardless of sex. This started with a sixth grader who did not want to wear skirts in junior high school and asked her female classmates for their opinions on uniforms. The responses showed that most of her classmates also wanted the freedom to choose their uniforms. The young student delivered the survey results to the mayor of Nakano, and all of the principals for the ward's public junior high schools agreed on the proposal, allowing students to freely choose their uniforms.

Schools allowing trousers for female students rose to 600 in 2019 from only four in 1997, and over 400 schools adopted genderless uniforms for 2022's fiscal year. There was a lot of support from female students for the adaptation of genderless uniforms and the implementation of slacks since it allowed for more comfort by keeping their legs warm and making it easier to ride their bicycles. The decision for genderless uniforms is also in consideration of sexual minority students.

In addition to changes made in the uniform, schools made adaptations to the school bags and uniforms for outside-of-class activities. In 2022, genderless swimwear was introduced at a few high schools and has quickly spread to more schools throughout Japan. Genderless swimwear gradually evolved from the need to protect against sunburn to a desire to deemphasize body shape by adding more coverage.

Cultural significance

School uniform varies throughout different schools in Japan, with some schools known for their particular uniforms. School uniform can have a nostalgic characteristic for former students, and are often associated with relatively carefree youth. Uniforms are sometimes modified by students as a means of exhibiting individualism. This is done in ways such as lengthening or shortening the skirt, removing the ribbon, hiding patches or badges under the collar, etc. In past decades, brightly colored variants of the sailor outfits were also adopted by Japanese ,  and  biker gangs.

See also
 Education in Japan
 Sailor dress
 School uniforms by country#Japan

References

External links

 School Uniform: Japan at Boys' Historical Clothing

19th-century fashion
19th-century introductions
20th-century fashion
21st-century fashion
School uniforms
School uniforms
School uniforms
School uniform